Dale Partridge (born 10 April 1985) is an American pastor and author.

Early life and education 
Partridge has studied part-time at Western Theological Seminary in Portland, Oregon.

Career 

In his early days, Partridge pursued a baseball career which ended early due to an arm injury. He then switched to entrepreneurship, and eventually founded the websites Sevenly.org and StartupCamp.com.

At Sevenly, he experimented with social/charitable cause-based business ecosystems by using art and fashion to raise funds and awareness for a new charity every week. In 2012, the business model of Sevenly was featured by Entrepreneur magazine.

Partridge has been featured in various business and editorial publications, including the cover of Entrepreneur and Inc magazines, Mashable.com, Forbes, the Los Angeles Times, and People magazine. He has also appeared on FOX News, and Today. 

Prior to entering into the ministry, Partridge was a businessman and author. He wrote People over Profit published by Thomas Nelson, which became Wall Street Journal bestseller. He has since written several Christian books including Saved from Success and Real Christianity.

Ministry 

Partridge leads a house church planting ministry, Relearn.org. It is focused on training, establishing, and supporting small biblical communities to “unlearn what culture has taught us about church and relearn how the Bible instructs Christians to gather.” In addition, Partridge hosts a weekly podcast, Real Christianity.

In 2015, on the TV show Good Morning America, Partridge revealed that his views on women's leggings influenced his wife to discard it from her wardrobe. Both conservatives and liberals took the internet to clash with each other on the age-old issue of using fashion as a tool to express one's ideology.

In January 2020, Christianity Today published an article about Partridge's frequent plagiarism. A second article by an anonymous author was then published on the website Medium, which documented the plagiarism with screenshots, showing it in Partridge's social media, books, and podcasts. Partridge has admitted that he has inadvertently used other people's work without attribution in the past and would put an end to this practice. However, he has continued to attribute quotes by others, such as by Martin Luther King, Jr., Ricky Martin, Ron Finley, and John Wooden, as his own words.

Personal life
In the same year, Partridge and his wife were sued by their neighbour for $150,000. The lawsuit was filed against them at Deschutes County Circuit Court for cutting down six juniper trees on their neighbor's property to have unobstructed views of the Three Sisters peaks. Later next year (in 2016), the lawsuit was settled out of court.

Books 

People Over Profit: Break the System, Live with Purpose, Be More Successful, 2015: Thomas Nelson (publisher), 
Launch Your Dream: A 30-Day Plan for Turning Your Passion Into Your Profession, 2017: Thomas Nelson (publisher), 
Saved from Success: How God Can Free You from Culture's Distortion of Family, Work, and the Good Life, 2018: Thomas Nelson (publisher), 
Real Christianity: How to Be Bold for Christ In a Culture of Darkness, 2019: Relearn Press

References 

American evangelicals
American self-help writers
American Christian writers
1985 births
Living people